Maya (formerly known as PayMaya powered by PayMaya Philippines, Inc. and prior to that, as Smart Money powered by Smart e-Money, Inc.), is a Philippine financial services and digital payments company based in Metro Manila, Philippines.

Smart Money was launched in December 2000, in cooperation with 1st e-Bank (formerly PDCP Bank; now BDO Unibank) and Mastercard. It is the world’s first card linked to a wireless phone and was marketed by Smart Communications as one of the biggest innovations in finance. In January 2016, the service was rebranded as PayMaya and, in the first quarter of the same year, reached the milestone of having processed $1 billion worth of transactions. PayMaya reached 44 million registered users by the end of 2021.

In April 2022, PLDT and Smart Communications, the two companies controlling PayMaya's parent company, Voyager Innovations, announced that PayMaya would be overhauled and renamed Maya, coinciding with the launch of Maya Bank. The said rebranding came to fruition on May 2, 2022.

Pegged as the country's only end-to-end digital financial service, the Maya app is powered by Maya Philippines, Inc. for its digital payments services and Maya Bank, Inc. for its digital banking services. The close synergy across the two companies means that Maya's customers are able to experience both payments and digital banking through an all-in-one money platform.

Products

Maya Wallet 
Maya Wallet, powered by Maya Philippines, Inc. and commonly still referred to as PayMaya, allows money transfers between Maya users; send money to other local banks; pay recurring bills; purchase mobile and gaming prepaid credits; pay offline merchants by scanning unique QR codes; checkout from online stores using virtual or physical cards; and get insurance coverage for e-commerce purchases, personal health, and mobile devices.

Although most of the transactions processed by Maya Wallet are generally in fiat currency, it also lets users buy, sell, and soon send and receive cryptocurrencies such as Bitcoin, Ethereum, Cardano and Uniswap in its Crypto section.

As of June 2022, Maya Wallet breached the 50 million registered users mark, making it the second most-used e-wallet service in the Philippines, only behind GCash.

Maya Savings 
Maya Savings, powered by Maya Bank, Inc., offers retail customers a high-yield savings with an interest rate of 4.5 percent per annum. During its launch, Maya Savings gave an introductory interest rate of 6 percent per annum to early-bird registrants, which is generally considered one of the highest that any local bank – traditional or digital – has offered at the time. When Liza Soberano who previously endorsed GCash was announced to be the newest celebrity endorser of Maya in February 2023, a promotional interest rate of 10% per annum was offered to qualified Maya Savings account holders, further widening the gap between Maya Savings and other digital banks.

Another version of Maya Savings is Personal Goals which effectively acts as a time deposit. The feature lets customers save at a guaranteed 6 percent interest rate per annum within a specified period of time.

In October 2022, Maya Bank, Inc. announced that it has 1 million registered customers and reached PHP10 billion deposits in just five months after its launch, positioning itself as the fastest-growing digital bank in the Philippines.

Maya Business 
Maya Business, powered by Maya Philippines, Inc. and formerly known as PayMaya Enterprise, enables businesses to accept digital payments, whether online or in-store.

Business Deposit, letting businesses earn 1.5% interest per annum and transfer to other banks for free, is also offered by Maya Bank, Inc. for Maya Business customers.

The pitch of Maya to businesses is it helps them grow in bolder directions through effortless payments and money management solutions in one seamlessly integrated platform.

Maya Center 
First introduced in 2004 as a separate remittance service of Smart Communications known as Smart Padala and eventually Smart Padala by PayMaya, Maya Center is a network of 55,000 partner agent touch points across the Philippines and serves as last-mile financial hubs in communities, providing the unbanked and underserved access to digital services.

Smart Padala by PayMaya rebranded to Maya Center in 2022, in accordance with the rebrand of PayMaya. It is the neighborhood destination for every Filipino’s day-to-day money needs. Its nationwide network of partner agents will bring a friendly way to facilitate remittances, payments, and other transactions for people with limited access to the internet. (Note that while Smart Padala will be transformed into Maya Center, domestic remittance remain as Smart Padala service.)

Recognitions

Innovation 
In 2021, PayMaya bagged two coveted awards from The Payment Association, namely, Leading Emerging Payments Organization Award and Most Innovative Mobile or Financial Service Payments Solution on the merits of PayMaya's commercial success and uniquely valuable e-wallet offerings to retail consumers.

PayMaya Negosyo and PayMaya's in-app KYC process were recognized as Best in Future of Digital Innovations and Best in Future of Intelligence, correspondingly, at the 2021 Future Enterprise Awards, presented by global market intelligence provider International Data Corporation. PayMaya's QR payments feature, on the other hand, was recognized as Best QR Payment at the 2021 Future Digital Awards for Fintech & Payments, organized by London-based global analyst firm Juniper Research.

Because of its unique AI-enabled integrated financial services model, Maya again made waves at the 2022 editions of Juniper Research's Future Digital Awards and IDC's Future Enterprise Awards – emerging as Platinum Winner for the Digital Bank of the Year Award and Best in Future of Intelligence at the two awarding bodies, respectively.

Among 12,500 applicants and nominees, Maya was selected by CB Insights as one of the winners in the fifth iteration of its annual Fintech 250 ranking. Maya, through its parent company Voyager Innovations, is one of only two Philippine-based fintech companies – the other being Tonik, a neobank – to enter the elite international roster alongside Revolut, N26, Stripe, and Binance among many other notable innovators in the financial space. The Maya app was also named among the world's most innovative apps for digital life at the 2023 Global Mobile Awards held in Barcelona.

Marketing 
PayMaya's transformation as Maya, the all-in-one money app, is hailed as one of the most effective rebranding initiative by any Filipino-led fintech company in recent memory. To show for it are top accolades from multiple prestigious awarding bodies, both locally and abroad.

Maya took home 11 trophies at the 58th Anvil Awards, making it the most awarded single brand out of more than 100 companies in the selection. Together with Bates Chi & Partners Manila, Film Pabrika, and Oliver Hub, Maya bagged a total of 11 titles with 3 Gold and 8 Silver awards at the 15th Kidlat Awards, the official Philippine partner of Cannes Lions.

In addition, Maya was one of only three local companies among over 3,000 entries from 21 countries that was recognized by the 2023 Spikes Asia. Spikes Asia is the oldest and widely considered as the most prestigious regional award for creative advertising. WARC Awards for Asian Strategy and Global Mobile (GLOMO) also shortlisted Maya as one of Asia's best.

Privacy 
Maya was recognized by the National Privacy Commission at the 2022 Privacy Awareness Week Awards for its efforts to build a secure financial ecosystem that caters to retail and enterprise customers. The two awards that it got were the Privacy Initiative of the Year for its #FraudPatrol campaign and Privacy Management of the Year for Maya Bank's data privacy practices.

The global risk intelligence company, SHIELD, also recognized Maya's security standards in its entire ecosystem; thus, presenting it the Trust Award at the inaugural Trust Summit held in Singapore.

Workplace 
PayMaya was distinguished as the Best Talent Acquisition Team by professional network, LinkedIn, during its 2021 Talent Awards in the Philippines. The organizers noted that PayMaya successfully leveraged the “10X talent” strategy, a term used in the book "Gamechangers" referring to transformative and agile talents, that allowed them to grow their organization at an unparalleled pace. Maya was once again selected by LinkedIn as a finalist for its 2022 Talent Awards for categories like talent acquisition, talent insights, learning, and diversity.

PayMaya also gained recognition at the 57th Anvil Awards for launching digital programs in data-driven recruitment, real-time coaching, and digital well-being, that encouraged employee engagement and built a safe workplace of the future. These initiatives, the company claims, reflect their people-first policy which is instrumental in attracting and retaining top talents.

References 

PLDT
Mobile payments in the Philippines
Payment service providers
Software companies of the Philippines